Lesotho competed at the 1996 Summer Olympics in Atlanta, United States.

Athletics

Men

Women

References
Official Olympic Reports

Nations at the 1996 Summer Olympics
1996
Oly